Marcelino "Marcy" Reyes Teodoro (born August 2, 1970), is a Filipino politician who is the 12th and incumbent Mayor of Marikina. Prior to his election as mayor, Teodoro served as the representative for Marikina's 1st congressional district from 2007 to 2016.

Early life
Teodoro was born on August 2, 1970, at a small clinic in Barangay Santa Elena, Marikina. He is the only child of Amado Teodoro, a government official, and Lydia Reyes, a teacher. He spent most his childhood with his maternal grandparents because both his parents were both busy with work. He completed his elementary education at San Roque Elementary School as a valedictorian in 1982 and secondary education at Marikina Institute of Science and Technology as salutatorian in 1986. He graduated with a Bachelor of Arts degree in philosophy at the University of the Philippines Diliman in 1990. The following semester after his graduation, at 19, he decided to delay law school and instead taught logic and social philosophy at the same university. He also attended graduate studies at the Ateneo de Manila University under the program of Master of Arts in Teaching Philosophy wherein he got a certificate course in 1997.

Political career

Local Politics
Teodoro was elected as a councilor of Marikina in 1992 at the age of 21.

Congressional career
Teodoro ran for representative in Marikina's 1st congressional district as an independent with the support of the then-incumbent mayor Marides Fernando. He would later win the election, becoming the district's first ever representative.

Legislative Portfolio 
On July 2, 2007, Teodoro initiated a bill to establish compulsory computer education for elementary and high school curricula and for other purposes. The bill called for the inclusion of computer education in the curriculum of public and private elementary and high schools. A day later, Teodoro authored a measure which provides for free public preschool education to all qualified children in order to promote quality education in all levels.

Teodoro was involved in the Billboard Regulation Act of 2007, which lists the prohibitions with regard to the installation of billboards and signage, to wit: a) those that obstruct the view of vehicular or pedestrian traffic; b) those on posts or walls that obstruct roadways and pedestrian lanes; c) those that take the space reserved for safety and informative road signs; d) those that block any rural or urban natural vista; among others.

Mayor of Marikina
Teodoro was elected Mayor of Marikina in 2016, defeating incumbent Mayor Del de Guzman. He was reelected in 2019.

During the COVID-19 pandemic, Teodoro's government was lauded for its response, particularly for the establishment of a testing facility for health workers and suspected patients.

Electoral History

Personal life
Teodoro is married to Marjorie Ann Ang, a teacher and a 2022 candidate for representative of the 1st district of Marikina, with whom he has one daughter named Francesca Ysabela Teodoro.

See also
Marikina
House of Representatives of the Philippines
Legislative districts of Marikina

References

External links
Marikina website
Philippine Congress Website
Computer Education Act of 2007
Free Public Education Act
Billboard Regulation Act of 2007

|-

1970 births
Living people
Filipino Roman Catholics
Independent politicians in the Philippines
Liberal Party (Philippines) politicians
Nationalist People's Coalition politicians
United Nationalist Alliance politicians
Mayors of Marikina
Members of the House of Representatives of the Philippines from Marikina
People from Marikina
Ateneo de Manila University alumni
University of the Philippines Diliman alumni